The Indiana Dunes is an area of land beside Lake Michigan, in the State of Indiana, United States. It includes Indiana Dunes National Park and Indiana Dunes State Park. This article is about non-native plant species, specifically the invasive species which have colonized that area. Invasive plants are those plants that aggressively spread throughout an area and out-compete other plant species, normally those that are native to the area.

Negative impacts
Invasive plant species in the Indiana Dunes have several negative impacts. They may:
Displace the variety of flowering plants, substituting a monoculture
Grow densely around trails, roads, and water, making travel difficult or impossible
Introduce toxins into the environment 
Have unpleasant spines or thorns
Smother ponds, killing fish

Specific examples include:
Purple loosestrife – establishes a monoculture, reducing the variety of wildlife.
Bush honeysuckles – prevents regeneration of woody plants and herbs, reducing bird habitat.
Glossy buckthorn – prevents regeneration of woody plants, slowly destroying forests.
Garlic mustard – alters the chemistry of the soil to kill other seeds, creating a monoculture.
Asian bittersweet – this vine can kill or damage trees and shrubs.
Crown vetch – alters the soil chemistry and pushes out the variety of other plants.
Japanese knotweed – tolerates floods and drought, creates a monoculture.
Spotted knapweed – releases toxins into the soil to poison its competition.
Common reed – this introduced non-native species aggressively pushes the native species and other aquatic plants out of the ecosystem.
Canada thistle – out-competes native vegetation in prairies, savannas, and dunes.

Species established within the Dunes

Current threats 
Acer platanoides     - Norway maple
Ailanthus altissima  - tree of heaven
Alliaria petiolata  - garlic mustard
Artemisia vulgaris   - mugwort
Berberis thunbergii  - Japanese barberry
Celastrus orbiculatus - Oriental bittersweet
Centaurea maculosa   - spotted knapweed
Cirsium arvense - Canada thistle
Cirsium vulgare - bull thistle
Elaeagnus angustifolia - Russian olive
Elaeagnus umbellata - autumn olive
Euonymus atropurpureus - burning bush
Helianthus petiolaris - petioled sunflower
Hesperis matronalis - dame's rocket
Holcus lanatus - Yorkshire Fog, velvet grass
Leymus arenarius - lyme grass
Lonicera tatarica - Tartarian honeysuckle
Lonicera hybrids - Hybrid honeysuckles
Lonicera japonica - Japanese honeysuckle
Lonicera maackii - Amur honeysuckle
Lysimachia nummularia - moneywort
Lythrum salicaria - purple loosestrife
Melilotus officinalis - yellow sweet clover
Phalaris arundinacea - reed canary grass
Phragmites australis - common reed, phragmites
Reynoutria japonica (syn. Polygonum cuspidatum) - Japanese knotweed
Rhamnus cathartica - common buckthorn
Rhamnus frangula - glossy buckthorn
Robinia pseudoacacia - black locust
Rosa multiflora - multiflora rose
Typha angustifolia - narrow-leaved cattail
Typha × glauca  - hybrid cattail

Emerging threats to natural resources or extent unknown
Alnus glutinosa - European alder
Carduus nutans - musk thistle
Coronilla varia - crown vetch
Cynoglossum officinale - houndstongue
Dipsacus sylvestris - common teasel
Euphorbia cyparissias - cypress spurge
Euphorbia esula - leafy spurge
Gypsophila paniculata - common baby's breath
Humulus japonicus - Japanese hops
Iris pseudacorus - yellow iris
Leonurus cardiaca - motherwort
Ligustrum vulgare - common privet
Morus alba - white mulberry
Myriophyllum spicatum - Eurasian watermilfoil
Pinus sylvestris - Scots pine
Populus alba - white poplar
Populus nigra - Lombardy poplar
Robinia hispida - bristly locust
Saponaria officinalis - bouncing bet
Ulmus pumila - Siberian elm
Vinca minor - periwinkle
Viburnum opulus var. opulus - European cranberry bush

References

List of invasive plant species
Invasive plant
Indiana, Dunes
Invasive plant species